Omar Ochoa can refer to:

 Omar Ochoa (cyclist)
 Omar Ochoa (footballer)